Changguan is a town in  Ningjin County in northwestern Shandong province, China, located about  south of the border with Hebei and  north-northeast of the county seat. , it has 50 villages under its administration.

References 

Township-level divisions of Shandong